Zinc finger DHHC-type containing 21 is a protein that in humans is encoded by the ZDHHC21 gene.

References

Further reading